Pseudobagrus brevianalis is a species of bagrid catfish endemic to Taiwan. First collected from Sun Moon Lake (the type locality), it is found in central and northern Taiwan, west of the Central Mountain Range. Based on lack of morphological and genetic differences, it has been proposed that Pseudobagrus taiwanensis is a junior synonym of Pseudobagrus brevianalis, but this has not been followed by online databases.

It has not been evaluated by IUCN but is classified as "vulnerable" in the 2012 Redlist of Fresh Water Fishes of Taiwan.

References

brevianalis
Freshwater fish of Taiwan
Endemic fauna of Taiwan
Fish described in 1908